Rice Lake is a city in Saint Louis County, Minnesota, United States. The population was 4,112 at the 2020 census.

Main routes include Rice Lake Road (County Road 4) and Martin Road (County Road 9).

Rice Lake Road runs north–south, and Martin Road runs east–west.  Other routes include Howard Gnesen Road, Arnold Road, Calvary Road, West Tischer Road, and West Beyer Road.

History 
Rice Lake was founded as a township in 1870.

After portions of the township had been annexed by the city of Duluth, the residents began the process to be recognized as a city.  On August 20, 2015, Administrative Law Judge Barbara J. Case signed an Order of Incorporation which allowed the township of Rice Lake to convert into the city of Rice Lake.

In an election held on October 13, 2015, Rice Lake residents elected a mayor and members of the city council. The results of the election were certified. The township was formally organized as a city on October 22, 2015.

Geography

Wild Rice Lake is partially located within the city of Rice Lake.

Amity Creek and the East Branch of Amity Creek both flow through the city.

The Lester River rises in nearby Gnesen Township and flows generally southeastwardly through the city of Rice Lake and Lakewood Township, turning southward as it nears Lake Superior.  The river flows into Lake Superior in eastern Duluth.

Adjacent townships, cities, and communities
The following are adjacent to Rice Lake:

 Canosia Township (west)
 Lakewood Township (east)
 Gnesen Township (north)
 Fredenberg Township (northwest)
 Normanna Township (northeast)
 The city of Duluth (south)
 The neighborhood of Duluth Heights (south)
 The neighborhood of Kenwood (south)
 The neighborhood of Woodland (southeast)

The Duluth International Airport is to the immediate southwest of the city of Rice Lake.

Ridgeview Road runs east–west along Rice Lake's southern boundary line with adjacent city of Duluth.

Lismore Road runs east–west along Rice Lake's northern boundary line with adjacent Gnesen Township.

Jean Duluth Road (County Road 37) runs north–south along Rice Lake's eastern boundary line with adjacent Lakewood Township; except for the southeast corner of Rice Lake where both Arnold Road and Martin Road together serve as the boundary line with adjacent city of Duluth.

Town Line Road briefly runs north–south along Rice Lake's western boundary line with adjacent Canosia Township.

Demographics

2000 census
As of the census of 2000, there were 4,139 people, 1,494 households, and 1,177 families residing in the township. The racial makeup of the township was 97.83% White, 0.29% African American, 0.58% Native American, 0.24% Asian, 0.10% Pacific Islander, 0.10% from other races, and 0.87% from two or more races. Hispanic or Latino of any race were 0.41% of the population.

There were 1,494 households, out of which 37.3% had children under the age of 18 living with them, 68.8% were married couples living together, 6.2% had a female householder with no husband present, and 21.2% were non-families. 16.8% of all households were made up of individuals, and 5.3% had someone living alone who was 65 years of age or older.  The average household size was 2.77 and the average family size was 3.10.

In the township the population was spread out, with 27.5% under the age of 18, 7.2% from 18 to 24, 31.0% from 25 to 44, 24.9% from 45 to 64, and 9.4% who were 65 years of age or older.  The median age was 38 years. For every 100 females, there were 103.1 males.  For every 100 females age 18 and over, there were 104.9 males.

The median income for a household in the township was $51,341, and the median income for a family was $55,357. Males had a median income of $39,894 versus $28,095 for females. The per capita income for the township was $18,857.  About 4.7% of families and 5.5% of the population were below the poverty line, including 4.9% of those under age 18 and 6.5% of those age 65 or over.

Politics

References

External links
City of Rice Lake official website

Cities in Minnesota
Cities in St. Louis County, Minnesota
Defunct townships in Minnesota
Populated places established in 2015